Sithembile Gumbo (1962/1963 – 15 April 2019) was a Zimbabwean politician who served as MP for Lupane East.

References

Date of birth missing
1960s births
2019 deaths
21st-century Zimbabwean politicians
Members of the National Assembly of Zimbabwe
Road incident deaths in Zimbabwe
ZANU–PF politicians
Zimbabwean politicians